Reassembling the Icons is the second studio album by Canadian rock band Parabelle.

Track listing

Personnel
Kevin Matisyn – vocals 
Aaron Burton  – lead guitar 
Kyle Mathis –  rhythm guitar 
Chris "Gio" Giovenco - bass
Jordan Hatfield - drums

References

2010 albums
Parabelle albums